Gajalu is a Nepali movie that depicts the life of living goddess Kumari after her retirement. Shristi Shrestha plays the role of Sujata Shakya, a former Kumari. The movie is about her friendship with her six friends who happen to change her life. This movie is partly inspired by novel named Half Girlfriend by Chetan Bhagat.

The film was produced by Rohit Adhikari Films in association with BC Motion Pictures. The screenplay of the movie was written by Hem Raj BC. and the music was composed by Hercules Basnet, Kali Parsad Baskot and Jaing. The movie was released on जेठ २८, २०७३/ June 10, 2016.

Gajalu is the story of a former Kumari who figures her way out of the traditional dogmas after meeting a group of friends, and starts living an independent life then after. The movie met with positive reviews and is considered to be best film of Anmol K.C.

Cast
Shristi Shrestha as Sujata Shakya/Kumari
Anmol K.C. as Aarav
Salon Basnet as Tanke
Gaurav Pahari as Om
Menuka Pradhan, as Prakriti/sister of Aarav
Rohhan Rai as Rohhan
Gauri Malla

Crew
The crew included Rajendra Moktan (colourist), Uttam Neupane Sound designer, Shailesh Shrestha (Background score), Shailendra Dhoj Karki (DOP), Surendra Poudel (editor), Keshav Thapa (choreographer), Saswot Man Shrestha (publicity designer), Mahesh Baral (associate), Krishna Shrestha (visual effects).

Track listing

International Release
Gajalu was screened in Cineworld, UK . This is the first time in history for Nepalese film to be screened in Cineworld , second largest cinema operator in Europe.

References 

Hem Raj BC

Films shot in Lalitpur, Nepal
Nepalese coming-of-age films
Films about Hinduism